Thomas Henry Parker Bowles (born 18 December 1974) is a British food writer and food critic. Parker Bowles is the author of seven cookbooks and, in 2010, won the Guild of Food Writers 2010 award for his writings on British food. He is known for his appearances as a judge in numerous television food series and for his reviews of restaurant meals around the UK and overseas for GQ, Esquire, and The Mail on Sunday.

Parker Bowles is the son of Queen Camilla and Andrew Parker Bowles. His stepfather and godfather is King Charles III. He has one younger sister, Laura Lopes.

Early life and education
Tom Parker Bowles was born on 18 December 1974 in London. He grew up in Wiltshire at Bolehyde Manor in Allington, near Chippenham, and later at Middlewick House, near Corsham. He and his sister Laura were raised as Roman Catholics. Both their father and their paternal grandmother, Dame Ann Parker Bowles, were Catholic. Like his father, he is in distant remainder to the Earldom of Macclesfield.

Parker Bowles was educated at Summer Fields School in Oxford. In the 1980s, he and his sister attended Heywood Preparatory School in Corsham. He later attended Eton College and Worcester College, Oxford. Parker Bowles states that immediately after leaving school, he fell in love with food writing, and cites his mother's cooking skills and recipes as his inspiration.

Career 
From 1997 until 2000, Parker Bowles was a junior publicist for Dennis Davidson Associates, a public relations firm. In 1999 there were newspaper reports that he took cocaine at the Cannes Film Festival. In 2001, he became Tatlers food columnist.

Since 2002 he has been a food writer, critic and broadcaster. He is a restaurant critic of The Mail on Sunday and food editor of Esquire. 
He is also a contributing editor to Condé Nast Traveller (UK and US), and Departures (US), as well as a regular contributor to Country Life, Harpers Bazaar and Town and Country. He was a contributor to Gordon Ramsay's The F Word.

From 2007 to 2010 he co-presented Market Kitchen on Good Food Channel, alongside Matthew Fort and Matt Tebbutt, and presented LBC Radio's Food and Drink Programme for a year. He was a judge on the ITV Food series Food Glorious Food and Channel 9 Australian cooking series The Hot Plate. In 2017, he was judge, alongside Matt Moran and Anna Polyviou on Series 1 of Family Food Fight (Channel 9 Australia) and filmed series two of Family Food Fight, which was broadcast in late 2018. He is also one of the regular critics on MasterChef (BBC 1). In 2014, Parker Bowles was named as one of the Top 10 most followed UK restaurant critics on Twitter.

Cookbooks
Parker Bowles's first book, published in 2004, was E Is For Eating – An Alphabet of Greed. His next, The Year of Eating Dangerously: A Global Adventure in Search of Culinary Extremes, was published by Ebury in 2007. AbeBooks named the book as one of The 50 Best Food Memoirs. His third, Full English: A Journey Through the British and Their Food was published in 2009 and won the Guild of Food Writers 2010 award for best work on British food.
His next book, Let's Eat: Recipes From My Kitchen Notebook, is a compendium of his favourite recipes from his childhood, collected from around the world, and written with the amateur cook in mind. The book was published by St. Martin's Press and was released in 2012. In October 2014, he launched his fifth book titled Let's Eat Meat: Recipes for Prime Cuts, Cheap Bits and Glorious Scraps of Meat, which was published by Pavilion. His seventh book, Fortnum and Mason – Christmas and Other Winter Feasts (4th Estate) was released in October 2018.

Business ventures 

In November 2011, Parker Bowles, along with food writer Matthew Fort and farmer Rupert Ponsonby, launched a pork scratchings snack named Mr. Trotter's Great British Pork Crackling. Following good reviews and successful sales of the snack, they launched a beer brand in 2013 named Mr Trotter's Chestnut Ale, which was produced in partnership with The Lancaster Brewing Company and is considered to be the first chestnut beer made in the UK. Mr. Trotter's has since begun expanding, creating different types of products.

Personal life 
On 10 September 2005, after five years of dating, Parker Bowles married Sara Buys, an associate editor of Harpers & Queen magazine and senior editor of British Town & Country magazine. The wedding took place at St. Nicholas' Anglican Church in Rotherfield Greys, Oxfordshire. His cousin Ben Elliot was his best man.
The couple had daughter Lola in 2007 and son Frederick in 2010.  Parker Bowles and Buys separated in 2018.

In 2019, Parker Bowles started dating former journalist Alice Procope. On 17 March 2021, Procope died in her home, seven months after being diagnosed with cancer.

Publications
E is for Eating: An Alphabet of Greed. (2004). Long Barn Books. 
The Year of Eating Dangerously: A Global Adventure in Search of Culinary Extremes  (2007). Ebury. 
Full English: A Journey Through the British and Their Food. (2009). Ebury. 
Let's Eat: Recipes from My Kitchen Notebook. (2012). St. Martin's Press. 
Let's Eat Meat: Recipes for Prime Cuts, Cheap Bits and Glorious Scraps of Meat. (2014). Pavilion. 
The Cook Book: Fortnum & Mason. (2016). Harper Collins. 
Fortnum and Mason: Christmas and Other Winter Feasts. (2018). Fourth Estate Ltd 
Fortnum & Mason: Time for Tea. (2021). Fourth Estate Ltd

References

External links

1974 births
Alumni of Worcester College, Oxford
British broadcasters
British cookbook writers
British food writers
British magazine editors
British radio presenters
British restaurant critics
British people of Canadian descent
British people of Dutch descent
British people of French descent
British people of French-Canadian descent
British people of Scottish descent
Businesspeople from London
Cubitt family
De Trafford family
Tom
English Roman Catholics
Family of Charles III
Fortnum & Mason
Tom
Living people
Tom
People educated at Eton College
People educated at Summer Fields School
People from Westminster
People from Wiltshire
Tom
Writers from London